The Oahu nukupuu (Hemignathus lucidus) was a species of nukupuu which was similar to its cousins from the Islands of Kauai and Maui. It is yellowish greyish with a long hooked beak to find insects. This bird is now extinct due to human activity.

Description

The males were mostly yellow across the belly and on the head.  From the bend of the wing, the feathers were primarily olive green. Its lores and legs were black.  The females and the young had similar coloration with the exception that the yellow was a dull yellow.  They had a long decurved beak approximately one and a half inch in length, the upper bill being twice as long as the lower.

Using their upper bill to pluck insects found underneath tree bark, the Oahu nukupuu fed on insects on flowering trees such as the koa (Acacia koa)  and ohia (Metrosideros polymorpha).  These trees attract a large amount of insects due to their nectar-filled flowers.  The Oahu nukupuu fed on koa in high elevation forests and fed on ohia in low elevations.

The species was believed to have vanished as the spread of disease occurred, killing off nukupuu populations across the islands. In order to control the rat population in the sugar cane fields, mongooses were introduced to Hawaii and were suspected to be predators that stole nukupuu chicks from nests, furthering the decrease in nukupuu population.

Of the last known specimens recorded of the Oahu nukupuu, about nine specimens were collected in 1837 by naturalist Ferdinand Deppe and ornithologist John Kirk Townsend.  A few more specimens were collected through 1841, and after an extensive search by ornithologist Robert Cyril Layton Perkins, the Oahu nukupuu was considered extinct since at the start of the 21st century.

See also
Hawaiian honeycreeper conservation

References

External links 
The Birds of the Hawaiian Islands:  Occurrence, History, Distribution, and Status” by Robert L. Pyle and Peter Pyle | Bishop Museum, Honolulu, Hawaii
BirdLife Species Factsheet CR(PE) – Nukupuu Hemingnathus lucidus | BirdLife International
ITIS Report:  Hemignathus lucidus lucidus TSN 729573 | Interagency Taxonomic Information System

Hemignathus
Oahu
Extinct birds of Hawaii
Articles containing video clips
Species made extinct by human activities
Taxa named by Hinrich Lichtenstein